Battle of the Sexes is a 1926 German silent comedy film directed by  and starring Aud Egede-Nissen, Paul Richter, and Vladimir Gajdarov.

The film's sets were designed by Max Knaake.

Cast

References

Bibliography

External links

1926 films
Films of the Weimar Republic
German silent feature films
Films directed by Heinrich Brandt
National Film films
German black-and-white films
German comedy films
1926 comedy films
Silent comedy films
1920s German films
1920s German-language films